Christopher Kelly is an American writer, who won the Lambda Literary Award for Gay Debut Fiction at the 20th Lambda Literary Awards in 2008 for his debut novel A Push and a Shove.

His second novel, The Pink Bus, was published by Lethe Press in 2016. He is also a journalist and film and theatre critic,  whose work has appeared in the Fort Worth Star-Telegram, Texas Monthly, The New York Times, the Newark Star-Ledger, Slate, Salon and The Boston Globe.

A graduate of Dartmouth College, he lives in the New York metropolitan area with his husband.

Works
A Push and a Shove (2007)
The Pink Bus (2016)

References

External links

21st-century American novelists
American male novelists
American film critics
American theater critics
Dartmouth College alumni
Lambda Literary Award for Debut Fiction winners
American LGBT journalists
American LGBT novelists
American gay writers
Living people
Year of birth missing (living people)
21st-century American male writers
21st-century American non-fiction writers
American male non-fiction writers
21st-century LGBT people